Matthew 'Matt' J. Fanning (date of birth unknown) is an English first-class cricketer.

While studying at the University of Oxford, Fanning made two appearances in first-class cricket for Oxford University against Cambridge University in The University Matches of 2018 and 2019, taking 3 wickets.

References

External links

Date of birth unknown
Living people
Alumni of the University of Oxford
English cricketers
Oxford University cricketers
Year of birth missing (living people)